Colloquially, a depository institution is a financial institution in the United States (such as a savings bank, commercial bank, savings and loan associations, or credit unions) that is legally allowed to accept monetary deposits from consumers.  Under federal law, however, a "depository institution" is limited to banks and savings associations - credit unions are not included.

An example of a non-depository institution might be a mortgage bank. While licensed to lend, they cannot accept deposits.

See also
Authorised deposit-taking institution

References

 Ruben D Cohen (2004) “The Optimal Capital Structure of Depository Institutions”, Wilmott Magazine, March issue.

Financial services in the United States